Hank Pfister (born October 9, 1953) is a former tennis player from the United States, who won two singles titles (1981, Maui and 1982, Newport) during his professional career. The right-hander reached his highest individual ranking on the ATP Tour on May 2, 1983, when he became world No. 19.

Being tall of stature, sturdy of build and possessing a very fast serve, his style was highlighted by use of the serve and volley game.

Career finals

Doubles (11 wins, 16 losses)

Singles (2 wins)

External links
 
 

1953 births
Living people
American people of German descent
American male tennis players
French Open champions
Sportspeople from Bakersfield, California
San Jose State Spartans men's tennis players
Tennis people from California
Grand Slam (tennis) champions in men's doubles
Pan American Games medalists in tennis
Pan American Games gold medalists for the United States
Tennis players at the 1975 Pan American Games